Damon Hayler (born 6 July 1976) is an Australian snowboarder, competing in the snowboard cross. He competed in the 2006 Winter Olympics and was rated as a medal chance.

He placed only 28th out of 36 competitors in the first qualifying run, but improved to 12th in the second. This was enough to make the 1/8 final, where he finished first. He came second in his quarterfinal, but was then disqualified in the semifinals. He then came third in the small final and was sevenths out of 36 competitors overall.

References 

Australian male snowboarders
Olympic snowboarders of Australia
Snowboarders at the 2006 Winter Olympics
Snowboarders at the 2010 Winter Olympics
Living people
1976 births